The Greater Washington Partnership is a civic alliance of the region’s leading employers who are committed to fostering unity and making the Washington–Baltimore metropolitan area the most inclusive economy in the nation.

History 
The Greater Washington Partnership is a civic alliance of leading employers and entrepreneurs that represent businesses across the region from Baltimore to Richmond. The nonprofit was founded in 2016, and grew from an original foundation of a number of businesses working to bring the Olympics (Washington 2024) to the region. The Partnership focuses advancing inclusive growth and fostering unity through three pillars of work: Inclusive Growth, Skills and Talent, and Regional Mobility & Infrastructure. Jason Miller was the Partnership’s CEO from 2017-2020 and was followed by JB Holston from 2020-2022. In 2022, the Partnership named Kathy Hollinger as its CEO. Co-Founders include Russ Ramsey, Ramsey Asset Management; Peter L. Scher, JPMorgan Chase & Co.; Ted Leonsis, Monumental Sports and Entertainment.

Transportation and workforce development were two early goals of the organization. In May 2018 the organization advocated for higher tolls.

Developing the region is part of a strategy to encourage more companies to establish themselves within the region.

The organization seeks to establish some standardization in regional educational credentials.

Activities 
When Amazon announced a North American sweepstakes for the location of its second headquarters in 2017, the Partnership contributed 11 addendums supporting each of the first round of bids submitted by jurisdictions in the region.  “When one wins, we all win,” was the theme used by the Partnership to show Amazon that the region had the businesses, talent, and infrastructure to support being selected as the second headquarters location. In November 2018, Amazon announced Arlington, VA as one of the locations for its second headquarters.

Regional Mobility & Infrastructure 
The Greater Washington Partnership is a founding member of the MetroNow Coalition, which works for long-term improvements to WMATA, the DC Metro system. In May 2018, MetroNow worked with other organizations, including CSG, Federal City Council, Northern Virginia Chamber of Commerce, The 2030 Group, the Greater Washington Board of Trade and Fund It Fix to get DC, Maryland, and Virginia leaders to approve $500 million annual funding for Metro.

In November 2018, the Partnership released its Blueprint for Regional Mobility, a comprehensive transportation strategy to improve commutes, increase transportation options, and provide better access to public transportation for people around Baltimore, Washington, and Richmond. It is the first-ever CEO-led agenda to improve the region’s transportation system. The Blueprint lays out four main priorities: connecting the super-region, improving the consumer experience, ensuring equitable access and integrating innovation as the keys to fundamentally transforming the way residents move around the region.

A few of the Partnership’s recommendations include a commuter rail network for the region, an expansion of the regions toll-lane network, improving the region’s bus network, and growing programs for commuters at private employers.

Dominion Energy CEO Tom Farrell, MedStar Health CEO Kenneth Samet, and EY global chairman and CEO Mark Weinberg are the co-chairs of the Greater Washington Partnership Regional Mobility Initiative and authored the Blueprint.

The Partnership has also released several issue specific reports on buses, integrated mobility, performance-driven tolling, and Richmond’s transit revolution. This includes a case study titled “Richmond’s Transit Revolution: GRTC Ridership and Accessibility Analysis,” which was released in June 2019. The study analyzed the launch of the Pulse Bus Rapid Transit (BRT) line, a bus redesign in Richmond and expansion of service in Henrico Country. The Pulse was recognized by the Institute for Transportation and Development Policy with a bronze ranking for design and implementation.

Housing 
In October 2018, the Greater Washington Partnership, together with the Urban Institute and JPMorgan Chase, launched the Regional Housing Framework, in an effort to address the Capital Region’s future housing needs.

On September 4, 2019, the Urban Institute released "Meeting the Washington Region’s Future Housing Needs", commissioned by the Greater Washington Partnership and JPMorgan Chase. The report provides business leaders, policy makers, community members and advocates with evidence-based insights so they can join the collective push for solutions and help create a healthy housing market in which residents and businesses thrive.

Skills and Talent

Capital CoLAB 
One of the Partnership’s main initiatives is to grow the region’s economic competitiveness. The Greater Washington Partnership created the Capital CoLAB (Collaborative of Leaders in Academia and Business), an alliance of educators and business leaders working together to develop talent in the region by providing them with enhanced digital technology education, to ensure people have the skills that employers require. CoLAB companies include Amazon, Capital One, JPMorgan Chase, MedImmune, Monumental Sports & Entertainment, Northrop Grumman, and Under Armour. University partners include: American University, George Mason University, Georgetown University, Johns Hopkins University, University of Maryland, University of Richmond, Virginia Commonwealth University and Virginia Tech. Wes Bush, Partnership board member and former Chairman and CEO of Northrop Grumman serves as the inaugural chair of the Capital CoLAB.

Digital Tech Credential 
In March 2019, the Capital CoLAB launched the digital tech credential program with colleges and universities in the Capital Region. The announcement was made at an event hosted with the Business Roundtable, “Driving Talent and Innovation in the Capital Region.” The Digital Tech Credential brings together big employers and higher education institutions in a collaborative effort to develop a skilled workforce for high-tech jobs. The credential was designed with guidance from regional businesses to certify that graduates have taken a series of courses that cover knowledge and skills in certain fields such as statistics, data visualization, and cybersecurity. The CoLAB based the program on 44 types of “knowledge, skills and abilities” that businesses say they want their employees to have to fill high-paying jobs in the age of digital information.

The credential program debuted in 2019 at George Mason University and Virginia Commonwealth University. American University, Georgetown University, the University of Richmond, and Virginia Tech launched their own programs in 2019.

In addition to the generalist credential, the CoLAB plans to offer additional specialized credential programs in cybersecurity, data analytics, artificial intelligence and machine learning.

References

External links

Organizations based in the Baltimore–Washington metropolitan area